Klub Futbollistik Arbëria, commonly known as Arbëria, is a professional football club based in village Dobrajë e Madhe of Lipljan, Kosovo. The club play in the Football Superleague of Kosovo, which is the top tier of football in the country.

History

Early years (1977–1990)
In 1977, a group of villagers sent a request to the village council of Dobrajë e Madhe expressing the common will to establish a football club. In June of the same year, some young people from the village before the village council proposed that this team be called KF Përparimi and this team would consist of young people from the village. The team at the first season was led by coach Adem Brestovci and part of the team were Xhelil Gashi (GK), Elhami Llugiqi, Elmi Bublica, Enver Llugiqi, Fatmir Bytyqi, Haki Tafili, Heset Llugiqi, Ismet Uka, Nuhi Bahtiri, Nysret Llugiqi, Qemajl Rexhepi, Sali Nuredini, Skender Gashi, Sylejman Statovci, Shefqet Bahtiri, Shemsi Gashi and Xhevat Berbatovci. Some of the players of this team were guides for many other generations by inspiring many young people in the village over the years to play football and all this unfortunately ended temporarily in the 1990s, where due to the deteriorating situation in Kosovo, the Serbian occupators was stopped all activities (including even sports activities) throughout Kosovo.

Returning, extinguish and second returning
After seven years break, in 1997, it was again the sports fans of the village of Dobrajë e Madhe brought the club back to functionality, but the club would be called KF Arbëria, in honor of the donor of the club of that time, Nazmi Rrustemi, where one of his businesses bore the same name. From 2003 to 2010 it was part of First Football League of Kosovo, while due to financial conditions in 2010, the team was extinguished.

On 30 May 2016, KF Arbëria is reactivated and Jahir Krasniqi was appointed president of the club, the club was registered in the Second Football League of Kosovo and after one season was promoted to the First Football League of Kosovo. In the 2019–20 season, KF Arbëria for the first time in its history secured promotion to the Football Superleague of Kosovo and this came after Football Federation of Kosovo's executive council stopped the all competitions (including even First Football League of Kosovo) due to the COVID-19 pandemic and decided that together with Besa Pejë, which until then were in the two first positions in the table be automatically promoted to the Superleague.

Players

Current squad

References

External links
 

Arbëria
1977 establishments in Yugoslavia
Association football clubs established in 1977
Association football clubs established in 1997
Association football clubs established in 2016
Arbëria
Arbëria